The 1978 season of the African Cup Winners' Cup football club tournament was won by AC Horaya in two-legged final victory against NA Hussein-Dey. This was the fourth season that the tournament took place for the winners of each African country's domestic cup.  Twenty-two sides entered the competition, with Sodiam withdrawing before the 1st leg of the preliminary round.

Preliminary round

|}

First round

|}

Quarterfinals

|}

1:KMKM FC withdrew before 1st leg.

Semifinals

|}

Final

|}

Champions

External links
 Results available on CAF Official Website

African Cup Winners' Cup
2